Simon Halsey, CBE (born 8 March 1958) is an English choral conductor. He is the chorus director of the City of Birmingham Symphony Chorus (CBSO Chorus), a position he has held since 1983, and has been chorus director of the London Symphony Chorus since 2012. He is also artistic director of the Berlin Philharmonic Youth Choral Programme and the director of the BBC Proms Youth Choir, and conductor laureate of the Berlin Radio Choir. He is professor and director of choral activities at the University of Birmingham.

Early career
Born in London, Halsey sang in the choirs of both New College, Oxford and King's College, Cambridge. He studied conducting at the Royal College of Music in London.

In 1987, he founded the City of Birmingham Touring Opera (since 2001 the Birmingham Opera Company) with leading international opera director Graham Vick. In addition, he was artistic director and founder of the professional choir European Voices, and principal conductor, choral programme, for the Northern Sinfonia from 2004 until 2012.

He founded the City of Birmingham Youth Chorus in 1995. His position with the CBSO Chorus brings him into regular contact with the City of Birmingham Symphony Orchestra, including as conductor of the annual Christmas concerts.

Halsey served as chief conductor of the Netherlands Radio Choir from 1997 to 2008.  He was international chair of choral conducting of the Royal Welsh College of Music & Drama from 2008 until 2014.

Current positions
Since 1983, Halsey has been the chorus director of the City of Birmingham Symphony Chorus.

Halsey is currently artistic director of the Berlin Philharmonic Youth Choral Programme and the director of the BBC Proms Youth Choir; he has held both these positions since 2012.

From 2001 to 2015, he also served as chief conductor and artistic director of the Berlin Radio Choir (Rundfunkchor Berlin). He gave his last concert in this role on 31 May 2015, his replacement being Dutch conductor . Halsey continues his association with the choir under the title of Conductor Laureate.  Since August 2012 he has been chorus director of the London Symphony Chorus. Since season 2016–2017 he is the artistic director of the chorusses of Palau de la Música Catalana, in Barcelona, and the Chorus Master of Orfeó Català.

He was involved in the BBC Proms in 2012–2015, preparing choirs for performances of Michael Tippett's A Child of Our Time (2012), Ralph Vaughan Williams' A Sea Symphony, Britten's War Requiem and Elgar's The Dream of Gerontius.

Other positions include artistic advisor of Schleswig-Holstein Musik Festival Choir Academy (since 2014), professor and director of Choral Activities, University of Birmingham (since 2012), and international chair of choral conducting for the Royal Welsh College of Music & Drama.

Halsey has worked with orchestras and choirs all over the world.  He has also conducted projects as diverse as Handel's Messiah with the Minnesota Orchestra and Fauré's Requiem with the CBSO Chorus and the Hong Kong Philharmonic. With the Berlin Philharmonic, he worked on a performance of Britten's Noye's Fludde, for the tenth anniversary of Berlin Phil Education. He is also currently the artistic director for Crowd Out, a massive work for chorus composed by David Lang. He has collaborated with director Peter Sellars for several oratorios.

Halsey has also been involved with numerous recordings, including a live recording of Beethoven's 9th Symphony with the CBSO Chorus  and the Vienna Philharmonic, under Simon Rattle. In 2006 he conducted the CBSO Chorus in their first completely choral recording, an album of English Choral Favourites. In addition, Halsey is consultant editor on Faber Music's Choral Programme Series of sheet music.

Awards
Halsey has won numerous awards, including three Grammys for Best Choral Performance. One in 2008 for a recording of Brahms' Ein Deutsches Requiem, by the Berlin Radio Choir and the Berlin Philharmonic, conducted by Simon Rattle. Another in 2009 for Stravinsky's Symphony of Psalms, [[Symphony in C (Stravinsky)}Symphony in C]] and Symphony in Three Movements, by the Berlin Radio Choir, Berlin Philharmonic and Simon Rattle. His third Grammy was in 2011 for Saariaho's L'Amour de loin, by the Berlin Radio Choir and Deutsches Symphonie-Orchester, conducted by Kent Nagano.

He has also obtained a number of other awards for his work, including a Diapason d'Or from Diapason magazine in France; a BBC Music Magazine award, and has won several German Echo Klassik awards.

Halsey was awarded the Bundesverdienstkreuz (Order of Merit of the Federal Republic of Germany) in 2010, and has three honorary doctorates, from Warwick University, the University of Central England and Birmingham University. In March 2015 he was awarded the 2014 Queen's Medal for Music.

Halsey was appointed Commander of the Order of the British Empire (CBE) in the 2015 Queen's Birthday Honours.

References

External links

 , Peter Sellars, 2010
 Profile and biography, Intermusica
 CBSO biography

1958 births
Alumni of the Royal College of Music
English choral conductors
British male conductors (music)
Living people
Alumni of New College, Oxford
Alumni of King's College, Cambridge
Officers Crosses of the Order of Merit of the Federal Republic of Germany
Academics of the University of Birmingham
Commanders of the Order of the British Empire
21st-century British conductors (music)
21st-century British male musicians
Choral Scholars of the Choir of King's College, Cambridge
Choristers of New College, Oxford